Gnosall railway station was a station in Gnosall, Staffordshire, England. The station was opened in June 1849 and closed on 7 September 1964.

References

Sources

Further reading

Disused railway stations in Staffordshire
Railway stations in Great Britain opened in 1849
Railway stations in Great Britain closed in 1964
Beeching closures in England
Former London and North Western Railway stations